Statistics of Swiss Super League in the 1937–38 season.

Overview
It was contested by 12 teams, and FC Lugano won the championship.

League standings

Results

Sources 
 Switzerland 1937-38 at RSSSF

Nationalliga seasons
Swiss
1937–38 in Swiss football